Jiroft (also Romanized as Jīroft; formerly, Sabzāwārān, Sabzevārān, Sabzevārān-e Jiroft, and Sabzvārān) is a city and capital of Jiroft County, Kerman Province, Iran. At the 2006 census, its population was 95,031, in 19,926 families. In the past it was also called Sabzevaran, and on account of its being very fertile land it is famous as Hend-e-Koochak (the little India).The civilization found in Jiroft is one of the oldest human civilizations (according to some, the oldest) and the manuscripts obtained from this civilization are before the cuneiform discovered in Mesopotamia.

Jiroft is located in a vast plain, Halil River, on the southern outskirts of the Jebal Barez mountain chain, surrounded by two rivers. The weather of the city is sweltering in summer – it is one of the hottest places in Iran – but temperatures are moderate in winter.

There is a large dam (Jiroft Dam) upstream the city (40 km North-East of Jiroft) on the Halil River (Halilrood). It is under operation since 1992. Having a reservoir of more than 410 million cubic meters of water, irrigates 14200 hectares of the downstream and generates electricity.

The city is served by Jiroft Airport, located several kilometres to the northwest.

Jiroft culture
A "Jiroft culture" has been postulated as an early Bronze Age (third millennium BC) archaeological culture, located in the territory of present-day Sistan and Kermān Provinces of Iran. The hypothesis is based on a collection of artifacts that were confiscated in Iran and accepted by many to have derived from the Jiroft area in south central Iran, reported by online Iranian news services, beginning in 2001.

The proposed type site is Konar Sandal, near Jiroft in the Halil River area. Other significant sites associated with the culture include; Shahr-e Sukhteh (Burnt City), Tepe Bampur, Espiedej, Shahdad, Tal-i-Iblis and Tepe Yahya.

The local language of Jiroft is Jirofti, also designated as Garmsiri. Garmsiri is a continuum of closely related dialects extending from the Halilrud river valley in the north down to the Strait of Hormuz in the south.

Recent finds
A report from Iran states that the Halil Rud region near "Jiroft became famous between 2002/2003 [when news of] thousands of confiscated burial goods, especially elaborated carved chlorite vessels from the necropolises of Halil Rud" were released to public.

Since February 2003, archaeologists have recovered a wealth of artifacts from the necropolis which they had named Mahtoutabad. For example, one grave contained "animal bones and food offerings, ceramics, and stone and copper items ... [indicating] a coherent cultural and chronological framework, around 2400–2200 BC".

Two nearby mounds were also excavated, named Konar Sandal South and North. A 2013 research paper about the South mound states that work during 2006 to 2009 "revealed the remains of three successive settlements dating to the fourth millennium BC".

Excavation re-commenced in 2014 and revealed art works of "complexity and beauty" and artifacts that proved that the society had several writing systems. According to National Geographic, the content of the mounds is significant:They turned out to contain the remains of two major architectural complexes. The northern mound included a cult building, while in the southern one were the remains of a fortified citadel. At the foot of the mounds, buried under many feet of sediment, were the remains of smaller buildings. It’s believed that the two mounds had once formed part of a unified urban settlement that stretched many miles across the plateau ... [artifacts] "have been dated to between 2500 and 2200 B.C. [They are said to be evidence of] the "development of a complex civilization".

Gallery

See also

Dalfard

References

External links

jiroft city website اطلاعات در مورد جیرفت  
مستند تمدنی گم شده lost civilization documentary with Roger Matthews (archaeologist) on YouTube
 Konar Sandal archaeological site 3000 BC

Populated places in Jiroft County
Cities in Kerman Province
Archaeological sites in Iran
Jiroft culture